The dhyana master Buddhabhadra was the first abbot of the Shaolin Monastery. He hailed from Southern India.

Former Worthies Gather at the Mount Shuang-feng Stūpa and Each Talks of the Dark Principle contains the following reference to him: "Dhyana Master Buddha says: "The extreme principle is wordless. The sagely mind is unimpeded."

According to the Deng Feng County Recording, Bátuó came to China in 464 and preached Nikaya Buddhism for thirty years. Thirty-one years later, in 495, the Shaolin Monastery was built by the order of Emperor Xiaowen of Northern Wei for Batuo's preaching.

Batuo's disciples Sengchou and Huiguang were both expert in the martial arts by the time they began their studies of religion with Batuo.

References

Sources
 

5th-century births
6th-century deaths
Northern Wei Buddhists
Indian emigrants to China
Abbots of Shaolin Temple